Jur River County is a county in the Western Bahr el Ghazal state in South Sudan, located in east and northeast parts of the state, Jur River County is divided into six payams (districts): Kangi Payam, Udoci Payam, Marial Wau Payam, Wan Bai Payam, Rojrojdong Payam, and Kuajina Payam. Jur River County headquarters has been relocated to Nyin Akok Village on the eastern bank of the Jur River.

Demographics
The county has a population of approximately 127,000 according to the 2008 census, most of them are from Luwo tribe, with a minority of Dinka Marial Bai.

References

Counties of South Sudan
Western Bahr el Ghazal